G200 or G-200 may stand for:

 GeForce 200 series, the engineering codename for a Graphics Processing Unit
 Gulfstream G200, business jet
 Matrox G200, a video accelerator chip
 Daihatsu Charade G200 automobile
 Giles G-200, an American aerobatic homebuilt aircraft 
 Mistral G-200, a Swiss aircraft engine
 Gruz 200, is a military code word used in the Soviet Union and the post-Soviet states referring to the transportation of casualties